At 6:00 am (Amsterdam Time) on 10 May 1940, during the Battle of the Netherlands, the German envoy Count von Zech-Burkersroda gave the Dutch Minister of Foreign Affairs Van Kleffens a message. It was not an actual declaration of war. The message was later interpreted by the Dutch as a declaration of war; however from the German side it was at the time seen as a mere warning, hopefully intimidating the Dutch enough to accept German military protection. At the time of delivery, the German troops had already transgressed the Dutch border.

The delivery
In the early hours of 10 May the German minister of foreign affairs Joachim von Ribbentrop ordered the German envoy in the Netherlands, Count Julius von Zech-Burkersroda, who had been living in the Netherlands for many years representing the German government, to deliver a message to the Dutch government. Around 04:00 local time the Dutch minister of foreign affairs Eelco van Kleffens was recalled from the Dutch war council to his department in order to receive the message. It was not easy for Van Kleffens to reach the building as The Hague was already under attack by German paratroopers and nervous Dutch soldiers manning checkpoints suspected anyone to be a fifth columnist. He was even arrested and released only on orders of the General Headquarters.

On arrival Van Kleffens received the envoy around 6:00 in his office, who entered, guarded by two Dutch officers, in tears. He had with him a transcription in German of the telegram. He should have reformulated it, but had been unable to, apparently having been overcome by his emotions, feeling deeply ashamed of the actions by his fellow countrymen. When facing Van Kleffens he was unable to speak but merely cried; after a while Van Kleffens asked him to hand over the paper so that he could read it himself.

It was directly apparent to Van Kleffens that the message entailed an offer to become a German protectorate (like Denmark had done a month earlier) under threat of complete annihilation of the Dutch state if the Dutch would refuse to comply. It would have to be made clear immediately that the Netherlands intended to continue the fight together with their allies; however, by the Dutch Constitution for a Dutch declaration of war, consent was needed of the States-General of the Netherlands. Therefore, he chose to answer that the Dutch government considered the Kingdom of the Netherlands to be already in a state of war with Germany as a result of the German military action. He answered by writing a reply with a blue aniline pencil on a small paper.

Many Dutch sources treat the telegram text as if it were a German declaration of war and change the typical style into standard sentences.

In English

The telegram

Telegram changed into a German declaration

Dutch reply

In Dutch

Telegram

Rewrite as declaration (in Dutch)

Dutch reply

References

External links 
Original German text of the telegram

Military history of the Netherlands during World War II
Military history of Germany during World War II
1940 in Germany
Conflicts in 1940
1940 in the Netherlands
Declarations of war during World War II
May 1940 events
Germany–Netherlands military relations
1940 documents